Mohammad-Hussain Sarāhang ( - Sarāhang; 1924–1983) was an Afghan ghazal singer and an exponent of Indian classical music from Kabul, Afghanistan.

Career and education
Mohammad-Hussain Sarahang (née Mohammad-Hussain) was born in 1924 in the Kharabat area of Kabul, an old district known for producing some of the country's greatest musicians. He was the second oldest son of musician Ghulam Hussain, who taught his son the basics of music. Sarahang studied Indian classical music in the Patiala style of singing under Ashiq Ali Khan.

After 16 years, Sarahang returned to Kabul at the age of 25 (c. 1949). Sarahang typically performed various genres of classical and semi-classical music including khayal, thumri, tarana and ghazal. He usually sang the ghazals of Amir Khusrow and Abul Ma'āni Bedil, famous poets who wrote in Persian, as he was a Bedil Shenās (Bedil Expert).

At the age of 25 (c. 1949), Sarahang participated in a festival of music held at Kabul's Pamir Cinema. Amongst the participants were Qasim and Bade Ghulam Ali Khan. At this festival, Sarahang was awarded a Gold Medal. A few years later, the government of Afghanistan awarded him the title of Sarāhang.

Books
He wrote two books about classical music, Qānūn-e Tarab (The Law of Music) and Mūssīqī-e Rāg-hā (Music of Ragas). He has also created or composed several ragas including Hazra and Minamalee.

In addition he once also wrote articles for the Pashtun Ghag newspaper in Kabul.

Honors
He earned the following titles and degrees from various music schools of India:

 Degrees of Master, Doctor and Professor of Music from Kalakendra School of Music, Calcutta
 Title of “Koh-e Beland” (High Mountain of Music) from Chandigarh School of Music, Chandigarh
 Title of “Sar Taj-e Musiqee” (Top Crown of Music) from Central School of Music, Allahabad
 Title of “Baba-e Musiqee” (The Father of Music) in his final concert in New Delhi, 1979
 Title of “Sher-e Musiqee” (Lion of Music) in his last performance in Allahabad, 1982

Death
Upon his last trip to India in 1982, Sarahang fell ill and was hospitalized and ordered not to sing and to keep his talking to a minimum. Sarahang told his doctors he was feeling homesick and he would get better if he went back to Afghanistan. He returned to Afghanistan but disregarded the orders of his doctors and continued his performance. In 1983 he became ill again and was hospitalized in Kabul where he died from a heart attack.

Notes

External links
 A collection of some of his performances from North Indian Classical Archive

1924 births
1983 deaths
Pashtun people
Afghan musicians
Hindustani singers
Afghan male singers
Male ghazal singers
20th-century singers
Afghan ghazal singers
Persian-language singers
20th-century male singers
20th-century Khyal singers
Classical music in Afghanistan
20th-century Afghan male singers